Anne-Marie Minhall  is an English radio presenter who works for Classic FM. She presents the weekday afternoon show from 12pm–4pm.

Early life and education
Minhall was born in London and raised in a Nottinghamshire village. She attended Clarendon College in Nottingham.

Career
Her broadcasting career started by volunteering at Radio Trent Careline and then becoming a newsreader at Trent FM. She presented the late-night show on the opening night of East Midlands regional station GEM-AM. She moved to Independent Radio News, in 1994.

Classic FM
Minhall joined Classic FM in 1996, four years after its launch, as a regular newsreader and as the main presenter of the weekly arts and culture show, The Guest List, which she hosted for just over three years. She has remained with the station ever since, and her work has included the Great Composers series featuring biographies and examples of music, and work as the news editor for Classic FM. In 2014 she became the weekday afternoon presenter, with a program consisting of Classic FM Requests  between 12 noon to 2pm  followed by her own show from 2pm to 4pm which includes the "Hall of Fame 3 at 3", a choice of three items from the Classic FM Hall of Fame. In 2018 it was reported that her show attracted 2.7 million listeners every week, out of the channel's 5.7 million weekly listeners.

Other work
Minhall presented the City of Birmingham Symphony Orchestra's "Spring Classics in Reading" in 2017 and  Bournemouth Symphony Orchestra's "Classical Extravaganza" in 2021 in Poole.

She has also worked as a voice-over artist for advertisers including Sport England and 20th Century Fox.

Honours and awards
In 2016, Minhall was ranked 10th in the Radio Times Favourite Radio Voice Poll (women), which that year was won by Kirsty Young.

References

External links
Anne-Marie Minhall on Classic FM
 

1965 births
Living people
British radio presenters
British women radio presenters
People from Nottingham